Thomas Edlyne Tomlins (bapt. 26 September 1803 – 17 May 1875) was an English legal writer.

Life
Tomlins was born in London, the son of Alfred Tomlins, a clerk in the Irish exchequer office, Paradise Row, Lambeth, and his wife Elizabeth. He was the nephew of Sir Thomas Edlyne Tomlins. He entered St. Paul's School, London on 6 February 1811, and was admitted to practice in London as an attorney in the Michaelmas term of 1827.

He died in Islington, London, in the spring of 1875.

Works
Tomlins was the author of:

 A Popular Law Dictionary, London, 1838.
 Yseldon, a Perambulation of Islington and its Environs, pt. i. London, 1844; complete work, London, 1858.
 The New Bankruptcy Act (23 & 24 Vic. cap. 134) complete, with an Analysis of its Enactments, London, 1861.

He also edited Sir Thomas Littleton's Treatise of Tenures (1841); revised Alexander Fraser Tytler's Elements of General History (1844); translated the Chronicles of Jocelin of Brakelond (1844) for the "Popular Library of Modern Authors"; and contributed to the Shakespeare Society A New Document regarding the Authority of the Master of the Revels which had been discovered on the patent roll (Shakespeare Society Papers, 1847, iii. 1–6).

References

Attribution

1803 births
1875 deaths
English legal writers
People from Lambeth